Sezincote or Seasoncote is a settlement and civil parish comprising Sezincote House and its estate, situated about 3 miles from Stow-on-the-Wold in the Cotswold district of Gloucestershire, England. In 2001 the parish had a population of 90. The parish touches Bourton-on-the-Hill, Condicote, Cutsdean, Longborough and Moreton-in-Marsh. Sezincote has a parish meeting.

Landmarks 
There are 26 listed buildings in Sezincote. Sezincote once had a church called St Bartholomew's but it was demolished.

History 
The name "Sezincote" means 'Gravelly cottage'. Sezincote was recorded in the Domesday Book as Cheisnecot(e)/Chi(i)esnecote. No traces of the deserted medieval village of Sezincote are in the grounds of Sezincote.

References 

Villages in Gloucestershire
Civil parishes in Gloucestershire
Cotswold District